Section 92 of the Constitution Act, 1867 is a provision in the Constitution of Canada that sets out the legislative powers of the legislatures of the provinces of Canada.  The provincial powers in section 92 are balanced by the list of federal legislative powers set out in section 91 of the Constitution Act, 1867.  The dynamic tension between these two sets of legislative authority is generally known as the "division of powers".  The interplay between the two lists of powers have been the source of much constitutional litigation since Confederation of Canada in 1867.

The Constitution Act, 1867 is the constitutional statute which established Canada.  Originally named the British North America Act, 1867, the Act continues to be the foundational statute for the Constitution of Canada, although it has been amended many times since 1867.  It is now recognised as part of the supreme law of Canada.

Constitution Act, 1867

The Constitution Act, 1867 is part of the Constitution of Canada and thus part of the supreme law of Canada.  It was the product of extensive negotiations by the governments of the British North American provinces in the 1860s. The Act sets out the constitutional framework of Canada, including  the structure of the federal government and the powers of the federal government and the provinces.  Originally enacted in 1867 by the British Parliament under the name the British North America Act, 1867, in 1982 the Act was brought under full Canadian control through the Patriation of the Constitution, and was re-named the Constitution Act, 1867.  Since Patriation the Act can only be amended in Canada, under the amending formula set out in the Constitution Act, 1982.

Text of section 92

Section 92 reads:

{{block indent|
{{block indent|2. Direct Taxation within the Province in order to the raising of a Revenue for Provincial Purposes.}}

{{block indent|

Section 92 is found in Part VI of the Constitution Act, 1867, dealing with the distribution of legislative powers.

Amendments

Section 92 has been amended once since the Act was enacted in 1867.  Section 92(1) originally gave the provincial legislatures the power to enact laws to amend the constitutions of the provinces, other than the office of the Lieutenant Governor.  Section 92(1) was repealed as part of the Patriation of the Constitution.  The provincial power to amend the provincial constitution is now found in section 45 of the Constitution Act, 1982.  The exception with regard to the office of the Lieutenant Governor is now found in s. 41 of the Constitution Act, 1982.

Background and interpretation 

The interplay between the list of provincial powers in section 92, and the corresponding list of federal powers in section 91, has been one of the most heavily litigated issues since Confederation in 1867.  The relationship between the federal and provincial powers is generally referred to as the "division of powers", meaning federalism issues, not separation of powers.

Both the provincial powers and the federal powers are stated to be exclusive, not concurrent.  A subject matter which falls within provincial legislative jurisdiction therefore does not come within federal jurisdiction, and vice versa.  Canadian constitutional analysis uses the term ultra vires as shorthand for a matter that is outside the jurisdiction of a government, and intra vires for a matter that is within the jurisdiction of a government.  Related constitutional doctrines such as paramountcy and inter-jurisdictional immunity are also used to assess the constitutionality of a law under the division of powers.

Although some of the Fathers of Confederation, such as John A. Macdonald, favoured a strong central government, other Fathers of Confederation, such as Oliver Mowat, were more inclined to broader provincial powers.  Quebec has traditionally favoured stronger provincial powers.  In the late 19th century and early 20th century, the Judicial Committee of the Privy Council, the highest appellate body of the British Empire, issued a series of decisions which expanded provincial powers at the expense of federal powers.

 Other sources of provincial jurisdiction
Section 92 is not the only source of provincial legislative authority, as there are other provisions of the Constitution Act, 1867 which confer legislative power on the provincial legislatures:

Section 92A, enacted by the Constitution Act, 1982, gives the provinces jurisdiction over natural resources in the Province;

Section 93 gives the provinces jurisdiction over education, including jurisdiction over denominational and separate schools in some provinces;

Section 94A confirms provincial jurisdiction over old age pensions and supplemental benefits, even when the federal Parliament has legislated in the area;

Section 95 gives the provinces jurisdiction over agriculture and immigration, subject to concurrent federal jurisdiction over those subjects.

There is also section 45 of the Constitution Act, 1982'', which gives the provincial legislatures the power to amend the provincial constitutions.

References 

Constitution of Canada
Canadian Confederation
Federalism in Canada